The Harbour Heat were a New Zealand basketball team based in Auckland. The Heat competed in the National Basketball League (NBL) and played their home games at North Shore Events Centre.

Team history
The Harbour Heat, then known as North Shore, started in the second-tiered Conference Basketball League (CBL). After winning the CBL Northern championship in 1985, the team was promoted to the National Basketball League (NBL) for the 1986 season. North Shore reached their first NBL final in 1988, where they lost 81–78 to the Wellington Saints. In 1998, as the North Harbour Kings, the team reached their second NBL final, where they lost 81–73 to the Nelson Giants. In 2000, the Kings were regular season winners for the first time with a 12–4 record. In 2007, the Harbour Heat were regular season winners with a 14–4 record.

After sitting out the 2011 season, the Heat returned to the NBL in 2012, only to withdraw again permanently after that.

References

External links
Harbour Heat at basketball.org.nz
1999 North Harbour Kings team
2002 Harbour Kings team
2003 Harbour Heat team
2003 Harbour Heat stats (1)
2003 Harbour Heat stats (2)
2004 Harbour Heat team
2004 Harbour Heat stats
2005 Harbour Heat team
2005 Harbour Heat stats
2006 Harbour Heat team
2007 Harbour Heat team

National Basketball League (New Zealand) teams
Basketball teams established in 1986
1986 establishments in New Zealand
Basketball teams in New Zealand